Jean-Paul Béchat (September 2, 1942 – November 22, 2014) was a French engineer. He was the CEO of Snecma then Safran until 2007.

Biography

Early life
Béchat was born in Montlhery, France.  He held an engineering degree from the École Polytechnique and a Master of Science from Stanford University.

Career
Béchat started career at Snecma in 1965 as a production engineer, where he spent the main part of his career. At the company he later became Director of production during 1974-1978, managing director of Industrial Affairs  between 1979-1981, then Assistant General Manager of the reactor power management subsidiary, Hispano-Suiza between 1982-1985. In 1986 he became General Manager then CEO of Messier-Hispano-Bugatti, later creating Messier-Dowty in 1994.  

Béchat was CEO of Snecma SA From June 4, 1996 to March 2005. Béchat oversaw the merger of Snecma and the defense-electronics maker Sagem, in 2005, to form Safran, Europe’s second largest engine maker . He ran the company as CEO between 2005 and 2007.

Board Memberships
Chairman of AECMA since October 2001 
Honorary Chairman and Member of the Board of ASD since May 2005 
Independent Director at Alstom Power AG and Alstom Deutschland GmbH since May 14, 2001 until July 2013 
Director of GIFAS since 2009 
Board Member of the IMS International Metal Service until 2010 
Board Member of Aéroports de Paris 2004-2005 
Board Member of France Telecom SA 1998-2003 
Independent Director of Alstom Finland Oy since July 9, 2004
Independent Director of Atos SE since 2009
Independent Non-Executive Director at Russian Helicopters JSC since 2011  
Chairman of the Board and CEO of PowerJet 
Member of the Advisory Board of Banque de France
Member of the Advisory Board of the General Board of Weaponry
Member of the Advisory Board of the MEDEF Executive Committee 
Member of the Advisory Board and Director of SOGEPA
Director of Messier-Dowty International

Awards
 Commander of the Ordre national de la Légion d'honneur
 Officer of the National Order of Merit (France).
 Commander of the Order of Ouissam Alaouite;
 Honorary Fellow of the Royal Aeronautical Society;
 Member of the Association Aéronautique et Astronautique de France (AAAF);
 Member of the International Academy of Astronautics (IAA).
 Gold medal of C.E.A.S. (Council of European Aerospace Societies)

Other Affiliations
Bechat also held the positions of a member of the UIMM, Board Member of the Musée de l'air et de l'espace, and member of the ASD council, in addition to having been a member of the Economic Council of Defense and the General Council of Armaments.

References

1942 births
2014 deaths
French chief executives
Commandeurs of the Légion d'honneur
Commanders of the Ordre national du Mérite
Fellows of the Royal Aeronautical Society
Lycée Hoche alumni
École Polytechnique alumni
Stanford University alumni